Anoplophora imitator is a species of beetle in the family Cerambycidae. It is distributed in China.

References

External links 
 

Lamiini
Beetles described in 1858
Beetles of Asia